Edith Marie Blossom MacDonald (August 21, 1895 – January 14, 1978), also known as Blossom Rock, was an American actress of vaudeville, stage, film and television. During her career she was also  billed as Marie Blake or Blossom MacDonald. Her younger sister was screen actress and singer Jeanette MacDonald.  Rock is probably best known for her role as "Grandmama" on the 1960s macabre/black comedy sitcom  The Addams Family.

Personal life

Blossom Rock was born on August 21, 1895, in Philadelphia, Pennsylvania. She was the second of three daughters born to Anna May (née Wright; July, 1871 – May 16, 1947) and Daniel McDonald (April, 1869 – August 8, 1924). The family later changed the spelling of their last name to MacDonald. As a youth, Blossom first performed in vaudeville with her younger sister, Jeanette. She had an elder sister, Elsie Wallace MacDonald (1894–1970), who had also been a vaudeville performer and then operated a dance school until 1962.

She married actor Clarence Warren Rock, on September 26, 1926, in Manhattan, and they performed as a vaudeville act titled "Rock and Blossom" from 1925 to 1929. Clarence Rock died in 1960, and the couple had no children.

Career
Rock adopted the name Marie Blake for her film career, beginning as a Metro-Goldwyn-Mayer contract player in 1937 with an uncredited appearance in My Dear Miss Aldrich. Her first credited major part was Love Finds Andy Hardy (1938), and she then played her most notable onscreen role as Sally, the hospital switchboard operator, in the nine films that comprised MGM's popular Dr. Kildare series from 1938 to 1942. She once had the same agent as Irene Ryan, whose similar career later caused Rock to fire him.

Rock returned to using her real name in the 1950s, and later gained her biggest fame by playing "Grandmama" on the ABC sitcom  The Addams Family, which was originally broadcast from 1964 to 1966. In October 1964, she made a public appearance in character at a haunted house at The Children's Museum of Indianapolis.

Illness and death

After production on Season 2 of The Addams Family concluded in 1966, Rock suffered a  stroke in December 1967 that affected her speech and prevented her from reuniting with fellow castmates for the 1977 television film Halloween with the New Addams Family. However, she watched the film from the Motion Picture & Television Country House and Hospital. She died at age 82 on January 14, 1978, in Los Angeles, California, and was interred in Forest Lawn Memorial Park in Glendale, California.

Selected filmography

 My Dear Miss Aldrich (1937) as Telephone Operator (scenes deleted)
 Thoroughbreds Don't Cry (1937) as Hospital Telephone Operator (uncredited)
 Mannequin (1937) as Mrs. Schwartz (uncredited)
 Love Is a Headache (1938) as Hillier's Secretary (uncredited)
 Woman Against Woman (1938) as Miss Van Horn — Ellen's New Nursemaid (uncredited)
 Love Finds Andy Hardy (1938) as Augusta
 Rich Man, Poor Girl (1938) as Mrs. Gussler
 Three Loves Has Nancy (1938) as Second Woman Getting Autograph (uncredited)
 Vacation from Love (1938) as Bill's Receptionist (uncredited)
 Young Dr. Kildare (1938) as Miss Sally Green (uncredited)
 Dramatic School (1938) as Annette
 The Ice Follies of 1939 (1939) as Effie Lane — Tolliver's Secretary (uncredited)
 Blind Alley (1939) as Harriet
 Calling Dr. Kildare (1939) as Sally
 The Women (1939) as Stockroom Girl (uncredited)
 The Secret of Dr. Kildare (1939) as Sally — Telephone Operator
 Day-Time Wife (1939) as Singing Telegram Operator (uncredited)
 A Child Is Born (1939) as Ethel — Reception Nurse (uncredited)
 Judge Hardy and Son (1939) as Augusta McBride
 Alfalfa's Aunt (1939 MGM Short) as Aunt Penelope 
 The Man Who Wouldn't Talk (1940) as (uncredited)
 Dr. Kildare's Strange Case (1940) as Sally, Hospital Switchboard Operator
 Sailor's Lady (1940) as Beauty Operator (uncredited)
 They Drive by Night (1940) as Waitress (uncredited)
 Dr. Kildare Goes Home (1940) as Sally
 They Knew What They Wanted (1940) as Waitress (uncredited)
 Li'l Abner (1940) as Miss Lulubell
 Gallant Sons (1940) as Woman Helping to Look For Ring (uncredited)
 Dr. Kildare's Crisis (1940) as Sally, Hospital Receptionist
 Jennie (1940) as Minor Role
 You're the One (1941) as Beauty Shop Operator
 Here Comes Happiness (1941) as Clara
 The People vs. Dr. Kildare (1941) as Sally
 Caught in the Draft (1941) as Nurse with Castor Oil (uncredited)
 Dr. Kildare's Wedding Day (1941) as Sally
 Remember the Day (1941) as Miss Cartwright
 Blue, White and Perfect (1942) as Ethel
 Dr. Kildare's Victory (1942) as Sally
 The Wife Takes a Flyer (1942) as Frieda (uncredited)
 A Desperate Chance for Ellery Queen (1942) as Motel Landlady (uncredited)
 Small Town Deb (1942) as Beauty Operator
 Calling Dr. Gillespie (1942) as Sally, Receptionist
 Give Out, Sisters (1942) as Biandina Waverly
 I Married a Witch (1942) as Purity Sykes (uncredited)
 Dr. Gillespie's New Assistant (1942) as Sally
 Good Morning, Judge (1943) as Nicky Clark
 Dr. Gillespie's Criminal Case (1943) as Sally
 All by Myself (1943) as Miss Ryan (uncredited)
 Campus Rhythm (1943) as Susie Smith — Hartman's Secretary
 Whispering Footsteps (1943) as Sally Lukens, boarder
 Make Your Own Bed (1944) as Woman Jerry Mistakes for Susan (uncredited)
 South of Dixie (1944) as Ruby
 Sensations of 1945 (1944) as Miss Grear (uncredited)
 Gildersleeve's Ghost (1944) as Harriet Morgan
 The Unwritten Code (1944) as Nurse (uncredited)
 Roughly Speaking (1945) as Nurse (uncredited)
 Keep Your Powder Dry (1945) as WAC Supply Corporal (uncredited)
 Between Two Women (1945) as Sally
 Pillow to Post (1945) as Wilbur's Mother (scenes deleted)
 Christmas in Connecticut (1945) as Mrs. Wright (uncredited)
 Abbott and Costello in Hollywood (1945) as Royce's Secretary (uncredited)
 Gentleman Joe Palooka (1946) as Maid
 Fun on a Weekend (1947) as Mr. Prigee's Secretary (uncredited)
 Dark Delusion (1947) as Sally
 Christmas Eve (1947) as Reporter (uncredited)
 Mourning Becomes Electra (1947) as Minnie Ames
 The Gangster (1947) as House Mistress (uncredited)
 An Innocent Affair (1948) as Hilda — the Maid
 The Girl from Manhattan (1948) as Committeewoman (uncredited)
 The Snake Pit (1948) as Patient Awaiting Staff (uncredited)
 Bad Boy (1949) as Miss Worth (uncredited)
 Alimony (1949) as Mrs. Nesbitt
 Angels in Disguise (1949) as Millie (uncredited)
 Chicago Deadline (1949) as Telephone Operataor (uncredited)
 Sons of New Mexico (1949) as Hannah Dobbs
 Paid in Full (1950) as Tired Woman Patient (uncredited)
 A Woman of Distinction (1950) as Wax Operator (uncredited)
 Joe Palooka in the Squared Circle (1950) as Prunella, Humphrey's Sister (uncredited)
 Love Nest (1951) as Mrs. Quigg (uncredited)
 F.B.I. Girl (1951) as Landlady
 Gobs and Gals (1952) as Bertram's Mother
 The Star (1952) as Annie, Stones' Maid (uncredited)
 Small Town Girl (1953) as Customer (uncredited)
 Phantom of the Rue Morgue (1954) as Marie (uncredited)
 The Human Jungle (1954) as Mrs. Ashton (uncredited)
 Hilda Crane (1956) as Clara — Mrs. Crane's Housekeeper
 The Desperados Are in Town (1956) as Mrs. Green (uncredited)
 She Devil (1957) as Hannah — the Housekeeper
 The Way to the Gold (1957) as Mrs. Lattimer
 From the Terrace (1960) as Nellie (uncredited)
 Swingin' Along (1961) as Woman in Apartment No. 1 (uncredited)
 Snow White and the Three Stooges (1961) as Servant (uncredited)
 The Second Time Around (1961) as Mrs. Vera Collins
 The New Phil Silvers Show (1964, TV series, episode "How to Succeed in Business Without Crying") as Mother Gilhooley 
 The Best Man (1964) as Cleaning Woman
 The Addams Family (1964–1966, TV series) as Grandmama

References

External links
 
 
  (as Blossom MacDonald)
 

1895 births
1978 deaths
American stage actresses
American television actresses
American film actresses
Vaudeville performers
Actresses from Philadelphia
Burials at Forest Lawn Memorial Park (Glendale)
20th-century American actresses